Valtice is a town in Břeclav District in the South Moravian Region of the Czech Republic. It has about 3,600 inhabitants. It is known as part of Lednice–Valtice Cultural Landscape, a UNESCO World Heritage Site. The historic town centre is well preserved and is protected by law as an urban monument zone.

Administrative parts
The village of Úvaly is an administrative part of Valtice.

Geography
It lies on the border with Austria and borders the Austrian municipality of Schrattenberg. The town is part of the European Centrope multinational region project.

Valtice lies in the Lower Morava Valley lowland.

History

Valtice Castle, then part of Duchy of Austria, was probably founded in the 11th century. The first written mention of Valtice is in a 1192 deed (as Veldesperch); held by the Lords of Seefeld, it was located close to the border with Moravia. Probably between 1192 and 1227, Valtice became a town. In 1270 lords of Seefeld died out and the estate, divided into six parts with different owners, changed hands several times. Between 1387 and 1395, the House of Liechtenstein gradually acquired the entire estate.

During the Hussite Wars, the Liechtenstein were on the side of Sigismund. In 1426, Valtice was burned out by the Hussites. The town was again devastated by the troops of the Bohemian king George of Poděbrady in 1458 as well as in the Austrian–Hungarian War by the forces of King Matthias Corvinus in 1480. The renewal and prosperity occurred in the first half of the 16th century, during the rule of Hartman I of Liechtenstein.

In the mid 16th century, the citizens converted to Protestantism; however they were subjected to the measures of the Counter-Reformation under the rule of Karl I of Liechtenstein, who himself had converted to Catholicism in 1599. During the Thirty Years' War, the town was again plundered by the troops under the command of Gabriel Bethlen in 1619, by the troops of Henri Duval Dampierre in the same year, and later conquered by Swedish forces under General Lennart Torstensson.

After the war, Valtice became the principal seat of the Liechtensteins. Prince Karl Eusebius had rebuilt the castle and had built a new parish church, finished in 1671. He also issued an order to establish forests east from the town. His descendants continued his work. His son and later his nephew had extended the castle and had the monastery of the Brothers Hospitallers built. The overall appearance of the town changed greatly between 1648 and 1781.

Until the end of World War I, Valtice belonged to Lower Austria. According to the 1919 Treaty of Saint-Germain-en-Laye the town and its surroundings were annexed by newly established Czechoslovakia. The main reason was the requirement that the entire Znojmo-Břeclav railway line, a branch of the former Emperor Ferdinand Northern Railway, remain inside Czechoslovak territory. The Liechtenstein princely family lost its privileges with the collapse of the Austro-Hungarian Empire. Valtice served as the Liechtenstein's residence continuously until 1939. The town was occupied by Nazi Germany upon the 1938 Munich Agreement and incorporated into the Reichsgau Niederdonau. After World War II the remaining German population was expelled and the castle was confiscated by the Czechoslovak government; all claims for restitution have been rejected.

Demographics

Economy

Valtice lies in the centre of Mikulovská wine subregion. The town is known as a centre of wine making in Moravia. Both the National Wine Centre and the Wine Salon of the Czech Republic reside in the Valtice Château.

Transport
Valtice lies on the railway line from Břeclav to Znojmo. It is served by two railway stations.

Culture
The annual Valtice Wine Market wine exhibition is held in the château riding hall at the beginning of May.

Sights

Valtice contains one of the most impressive Baroque residences of Central Europe. It was designed as the seat of the ruling princes of Liechtenstein by Johann Bernhard Fischer von Erlach in the early 18th century.

The main features of the Lednice–Valtice Cultural Landscape located in Valtice are the castle surrounded by an English park with a colonnade in the Neoclassical style, and the Temple of Diana from 1812 designed by Joseph Hardtmuth.

Notable people
Johannes Matthias Sperger (1750–1812), contrabassist, composer
Franz Bauer (1758–1840), microscopist and botanical artist
Ferdinand Bauer (1760–1826), botanical illustrator
Johann II, Prince of Liechtenstein (1840–1929), monarch; died here
Leopold Adametz (1861–1941), zoologist
Ivana Hloužková (1960–2023), actress
Radim Nečas (born 1969), footballer
František Čermák (born 1976), tennis player
Barbora Seidlová (born 1981), actress

References

External links

World Heritage Site
Photos of Valtice

Cities and towns in the Czech Republic
Populated places in Břeclav District
World Heritage Sites in the Czech Republic
Palaces in the Czech Republic
House of Liechtenstein
Territorial disputes of Czechoslovakia